The Queensland Film Corporation (QFC) was a government-funded film production company that existed in the state of Queensland, Australia, in the 1980s.

History
The Queensland Film Corporation was established by the Queensland Film Industry Development Act 1977 and funded by the Queensland Government Its original brief was not to produce films but to encourage the development of the film industry in Queensland.

At one stage it was run by Allan Callaghan, former press officer to Sir Joh Bjelke-Petersen who was sent to gaol for misappropriating government funds.

The organisation was eventually wound up in October 1987, having spent $5.4 million on various projects.

The Queensland government later formed Film Queensland and the Pacific Film and TV Corporation.

Current equivalent
 the funding body is Screen Queensland, which owns the Screen Queensland Studios.

Selected films
Final Cut (1980)
Touch and Go (1980)
The Little Feller (1982)
Buddies (1983)
The Settlement (1984)
The Naked Country (1985)
Frenchman's Farm (1987)
Travelling North (1987)
Fields of Fire (1987) (miniseries)

See also

List of films shot in Queensland

References

External links
Queensland Film Corporation at IMDb

Film production companies of Australia
Companies based in Queensland
1977 establishments in Australia
1987 disestablishments in Australia
Defunct government-owned companies of Australia
State-owned film companies
Australian companies established in 1977
Financial services companies established in 1977
Australian companies disestablished in 1987
Financial services companies disestablished in 1987